Rita is the 1986 debut album of Israeli singer Rita Yahan-Farouz.

It went quadruple platinum and established her as a popular singer in Israel. Following its release it became the best selling debut album of an Israeli musician. Rita wrote the lyrics for three songs. The album is largely a "collection of slow numbers", many of them piano-based songs written by her then husband Rami Kleinstein, co-produced with Reuven Shapira and Naor Dayan.

Track listing

References

1986 debut albums
Rita (Israeli singer) albums